The 1957 Critérium du Dauphiné Libéré was the 11th edition of the Critérium du Dauphiné Libéré cycle race and was held from 8 June to 16 June 1957. The race started in Saint-Étienne and finished in Grenoble. The race was won by Marcel Rohrbach.

General classification

References

1957
1957 in French sport
June 1957 sports events in Europe